The Kuwait national beach handball team is the national team of Kuwait. It is governed by the Kuwait Handball Association and takes part in international beach handball competitions.

In 2015, the Kuwait Handball Association was suspended from the International Handball Federation and banned from "sporting contact" with IHF member federations.

World Championship results

References

External links
Official website
IHF profile

Beach handball
National beach handball teams
Beach handball